The Sant Jordi Awards are film prizes awarded annually by the Catalan branch of the Spanish public radio network Radio Nacional de España (RNE), Ràdio 4. The awards were established in 1957.

Awards are made in the following categories: Best Debut Feature Film, Best Spanish Film, Best Actress in a Spanish Film, Best Actor in a Spanish Film, Best Foreign Film, Best Actress in a Foreign Film,  Best Actor in a Foreign Film, Special Jury Prize, Film Industry Prize, RNE Critics' Prize.

Best Spanish Film

References

External links
 Official website

Spanish film awards
Catalan culture